Mindaugas Griškonis (born 17 January 1986) is a Lithuanian rower. Competing in the single sculls he won six medals at the European and world championships between 2007 and 2015, including three European gold medals. He placed eighth at the 2008 and 2012 Olympics, before getting his first Olympic medal in the double scull event in 2016, a silver with Saulius Ritter.

References

External links

 
 
 Website of Mindaugas Griskonis

Living people
1986 births
Lithuanian male rowers
Sportspeople from Vilnius
Rowers at the 2008 Summer Olympics
Rowers at the 2012 Summer Olympics
Rowers at the 2016 Summer Olympics
Rowers at the 2020 Summer Olympics
Olympic rowers of Lithuania
World Rowing Championships medalists for Lithuania
Olympic silver medalists for Lithuania
Olympic medalists in rowing
Medalists at the 2016 Summer Olympics
European Rowing Championships medalists